High Fidelity is an American romantic comedy television series, based on the 1995 novel High Fidelity by Nick Hornby and the 2000 High Fidelity film. It premiered on the Hulu streaming service on February 14, 2020. The series starred Zoë Kravitz, whose mother Lisa Bonet appeared in the original film. Although favorably reviewed, the series was canceled in August 2020 after one season.

Premise
High Fidelity follows "the ultimate music fan, a record store owner who's obsessed with pop culture and Top Five lists" in the neighborhood of Crown Heights, Brooklyn.

Cast and characters

Main

 Zoë Kravitz as Robyn "Rob" Brooks, the owner of Championship Vinyl who struggles with a lifetime of failed relationships
 Jake Lacy as Clyde
 Da'Vine Joy Randolph as Cherise, an employee at Championship Vinyl and one of Rob's best friends
 David H. Holmes as Simon, an employee at Championship Vinyl and Rob's other best friend who is also Rob's heartbreak story #3

Recurring

 Kingsley Ben-Adir as Russell "Mac" McCormack, Rob's latest ex-boyfriend who broke her heart and heartbreak story #5 
 Rainbow Sun Francks as Cameron Brooks, Rob's brother 
 Nadine Malouf as Nikki Brooks, Cameron's pregnant wife and Rob's sister-in-law 
 Antonio Ortiz as Carlos, a bodega cashier 
 Edmund Donovan as Blake, a barista who flirts with Simon

Guest
 Clark Furlong as Kevin Bannister, Rob's heartbreak story #1 when she was in middle school
 Ivanna Sakhno as Kat Monroe, Rob's heartbreak story #2 
 Justin Silver as Justin Kitt, Rob's heartbreak story #4 
 Kevin Iso as Lewis, a friend of Rob, Simon, and Cherise 
 Thomas Doherty as Liam Shawcross, a young Scottish musician 
 Debbie Harry as herself 
 Jeffrey Nordling as Tim Parker, a music enthusiast whose wife is secretly selling his vinyl collection 
 Parker Posey as Noreen Parker, an Upper West artist who wants to sell her husband Tim's vinyl collection 
 Jack Antonoff as himself 
 Sydney Mae Diaz and Kyoko Takenaka as Shane and Peachy, two aspiring musicians who borrow the store's records 
 Brian Silliman as the Hammer, an old friend of Rob and Cameron  
 Christian Coulson as Benjamin Young, a lawyer and Simon's on-again, off-again boyfriend 
 Dana Drori as Lily, Mac's fiancée 
Tara Summers as Tanya, Rob's first roommate, with whom she goes out on her 30th birthday

Episodes

Production

Development
On April 5, 2018, Disney announced it was developing a television series adaptation of their 2000 Touchstone film High Fidelity to be written by Veronica West and Sarah Kucserka with the intention of distributing it through their then-unnamed upcoming streaming service, now known as Disney+. Production companies involved with the series were slated to consist of Midnight Radio and ABC Signature Studios. On September 24, 2018, it was announced that Disney had given the production a series order for a first season consisting of ten episodes. Executive producers were expected to include West, Kucserka, Josh Appelbaum, Andre Nemec, Jeff Pinkner, Scott Rosenberg, and Zoë Kravitz. On April 9, 2019, it was announced that the series has been moved from Disney+ to Hulu. In July 2019, during an interview, Natasha Lyonne revealed that she was directing an episode of High Fidelity. On August 5, 2020, Hulu canceled the series after one season.

Casting
Alongside the series order announcement, it was confirmed that Zoë Kravitz, whose mother Lisa Bonet appeared in the 2000 film adaptation, is set to star in the series. On April 22, 2019, it was announced that Jake Lacy had been cast as a series regular. On May 17, 2019, it was reported that Da'Vine Joy Randolph and David Holmes had joined the main cast. In the same month, Kingsley Ben-Adir was cast in a guest starring role.

Filming 
The principal photography started around July 2019 in Brooklyn.

Release

Broadcast 
High Fidelity premiered on February 14, 2020. The first three episodes were also aired on March 16, 2020, on Freeform. Internationally, the series premiered on February 21, 2020, in Canada on Starz and on May 1, 2020, in Australia on ABC iview and ABC Comedy. It was also released in select territories like Australia, the UK and Canada on Disney+ under the Star content hub and on Star+ in Latin America.

Marketing
The first set of images were released in late October 2019 with the announcement of series premiere date. The teaser trailer for the series was released on December 20, 2019

Reception

Critical response 
On the review aggregator website Rotten Tomatoes, the series holds an 86% approval rating with 70 reviews, with an average rating of 7.79/10. The website's critical consensus states, "Though it skips the occasional beat, High Fidelity fresh take on a familiar track is as witty as it is emotionally charged, giving the charming and curmudgeonly Zoe Kravitz plenty of room to shine." On Metacritic, it has a weighted average score of 70 out of 100, based on 28 critics, indicating "generally favorable reviews".

Accolades

References

External links

2020s American romantic comedy television series
2020s American LGBT-related comedy television series
2020 American television series debuts
2020 American television series endings
English-language television shows
Hulu original programming
Television shows based on British novels
Bisexuality-related television series
Television series by ABC Signature Studios